Lajos Máté (born 10 July 1928) was a Hungarian alpine skier. He competed in three events at the 1948 Winter Olympics.

References

1928 births
Living people
Hungarian male alpine skiers
Olympic alpine skiers of Hungary
Alpine skiers at the 1948 Winter Olympics
Skiers from Budapest
20th-century Hungarian people